The November 1941 formation of the 257th Rifle Division was an infantry division of the Red Army, the second unit to bear the designation during World War II. The division joined the 3rd Shock Army and was sent into battle in the Toropets–Kholm offensive in January 1942. Following the conclusion of the offensive, the 257th defended positions northeast of the city of Velikiye Luki for much of the year. For distinguishing itself during the Battle of Velikiye Luki in late 1942 and early 1943, the division was reorganized as the 91st Guards Rifle Division in April 1943.

Formation and Toropets–Kholm Offensive 
The 257th Rifle Division (second formation) was formed in Kalinin Oblast during November and December 1941, under the command of Major General Karp Zheleznikov. The division began forming in accordance with a directive of the Northwestern Front dated 8 November 1941 in the area of Kuzhenkino and Yedrovo. Its units reused the same numbers as the previously disbanded first formation of the 257th Rifle Division. It included the 943rd, 948th, and 953rd Rifle Regiments, the 793rd Artillery Regiment, and smaller support units. The 257th was sent to the 3rd Shock Army of the Northwestern Front, and entered combat for the first time during the Toropets–Kholm offensive in January 1942. On 21 January, the 257th, advancing on Velikiye Luki, entered Snopovo, cutting the road between Kholm and Toropets. Zheleznikov suffered a leg fracture in an accident on 23 January and was evacuated from the front, and division chief of staff Lieutenant Colonel Aleksandr Letunov became acting division commander. Colonel Anatoly Dyakonov took command of the division on 29 January. During the offensive, the 257th broke through German defenses northwest of Ostashkov in conjunction with other units of the army, and overcame stubborn resistance to develop the offensive towards Velikiye Luki. From late January to November, the division as part of the 3rd Shock Army of the Kalinin Front defended positions northeast of Velikiye Luki. In the spring of 1942, the 31st Rifle Brigade and two ski battalions were placed under the control of the division, expanding its defensive line from 40 to 80 km.

Battle of Velikiye Luki 
During the winter of 1942–1943, the 257th fought in the Battle of Velikiye Luki to destroy the German garrison of the city, which was captured on 17 January 1943. For the battle in the city, the division trained extensively for urban warfare, practicing attacks upon mock German fortifications built from snow. Dyakonov created five assault detachments of up to a hundred soldiers from the personnel of the division, consisting of sappers, machine gunners, mortarmen, smoke screen deployers, artillerymen, and Ampulomet throwers. Each detachment included reconnaissance, assault, support, reinforcement, and reserve groups. The assault on the city began at 10:00 on 13 December with a Katyusha rocket salvo, followed by artillery preparation. The 357th and 257th Rifle Divisions attacked from the west, while the 7th Estonian Rifle Division attacked from the east. The artillery fire proved ineffective due to poor visibility and unsuppressed German machine gun fire brought the infantry to a halt. However, the assault groups of the 257th continued the attack with relative success, crossing the Lovat. The infantrymen followed the assault groups, clearing the remaining German centers of resistance. Due to lack of preparation, the 357th and the 7th Estonian Rifle Divisions, who attacked with reinforced battalions instead of assault groups, failed to achieve their objectives and the city was not captured by the target date of 16 December.

As a result, army commander Kuzma Galitsky decided to send the 249th Estonian Rifle Division into action to break the stalemate, while the 257th was ordered to capture strongpoints on the outskirts of the city that flanked the advancing forces. The offensive resumed in earnest on 18 December, with the 257th continuing its relatively successful advance, but the Estonian divisions made almost no progress and German reports indicated the defection of Estonian troops. Galitsky ordered the 47th Mechanized Brigade of the 2nd Mechanized Corps into action, with the 257th attacking from the north and the 47th from the south to split the German garrison in half. The assault began on 25 December, and by 30 December the 257th had captured the northern half of the city center, while the 47th made steady progress made possible by the defenders' lack of anti-tank guns. The infantrymen and tankers were separated by only four quarters of the city by the evening of 30 December. The following day brought the fiercest street fighting of the battle and by 1 January 1943 the majority of the city had been cleared of resistance. The 257th and 47th linked up, splitting the garrison between the area of the railway station and the old fortress.

Realizing the ineffectiveness of national divisions, Galitsky continued the offensive with the 257th and the 47th. In the following days, the 257th and 47th mopped up the remaining German resistance, finishing with the capture of the citadel on 16 January.

In March, Major General Mikhail Ozimin became division commander. For the "skill and courage" demonstrated by its personnel during the battle, the division was reorganized as the 91st Guards Rifle Division on 18 April 1943.

References

Citations

Bibliography 

 
 
 

Infantry divisions of the Soviet Union in World War II
Military units and formations established in 1941
Military units and formations disestablished in 1943